

Major bridges

See also 

 Transport in Uganda
 Rail transport in Uganda

References 
 Nicolas Janberg, Structurae.com, International Database for Civil and Structural Engineering

 Others references

Uganda

b
Bridges